The eighth season of the long-running Australian medical drama All Saints began airing on 8 February 2005 and concluded on 22 November 2005 with a total of 41 episodes.

Cast

Regular
 John Howard as Frank Campion
 Alexandra Davies as Cate McMasters
 Christopher Gabardi as Vincent Hughes
 Tammy MacIntosh as Charlotte Beaumont
 Judith McGrath as Von Ryan
 Mark Priestley as Dan Goldman
 Natalie Saleeba as Jessica Singleton
 Paul Tassone as Nelson Curtis
 Wil Traval as Jack Quade
 Georgie Parker as Terri Sullivan (episodes 1-19)
 Chris Vance as Sean Everleigh (episodes 40-41)

Recurring
 Celia Ireland as Regina Butcher (episodes 1-12)
 Sibylla Budd as Deanna Richardson (episodes 40-41)

Guest
Trilby Beresford as Kathleen Campion (6 episodes)
 Susan Prior as Beth Chandler (15 episodes)
 Kate Sheil as Victoria Carlton (3 episodes)
Jaime Mears as Kerry Lytton (19 episodes)
 Ben Tari as Jared Levine (1 episode)
 Liz Alexander as Dr. Alison Newell (7 episodes)
 Grant Bowler as Nigel 'Mac' Macpherson (6 episodes)
 Anne Tenney as Trish Turner (3 episodes)
Troy Planet as Denis Pool (1 episode)
 Nicole da Silva as Sasha Fernandez (15 episodes)
 Wendy Strehlow as Lorraine Tanner (8 episodes)
Douglas Hansell as Aaron Roth (7 episodes)
Jacob Allan as Colin Fenely (3 episodes)
 Peter Phelps as Doug 'Spence' Spencer (6 episodes)
 Alexandra Fowler as Eve Ballantyne (1 episode)
 Augusto Suarez as Dave Forbes (1 episode)

Episodes

Please Note: All episode titles are listed accurately as to how they appeared on the episode.

References

General
 Zuk, T. All Saints Series 8 episode guide, Australian Television Information Archive. Retrieved 15 July 2008.
 TV.com editors. All Saints Episode Guide - Season 8, TV.com. Retrieved 15 July 2008.

Specific

All Saints (TV series) seasons
2005 Australian television seasons